This is a list of federations that are members of the International Federation of Bodybuilding and Fitness (IFBB).  As of December 2015, the IFBB has over 190 national federation members.  In some countries there may be more than one local bodybuilding organization; however, the IFBB chooses only one per nation to represent the IFBB for that respective country.

Continental federations
Four different continental federations exist that each national federation can choose to be a part of.

National federations

References

Bodybuilding organizations
Bodybuilding
Lists of sports organizations
Incomplete sports lists
Incomplete sports result lists